Soft White Underbelly is an American YouTube channel featuring interviews by Skid Row, Los Angeles-based photographer and filmmaker Mark Laita with "people who are frequently invisible in society—the unhoused, the sex worker, the chronic drug user, the runaway, the gang member, the poor and the sick". The channel was created by Laita in April 2016.

Lateshia Beachum wrote in the Washington Post that "Laita's warmly lit videos are portraits of addicts who recount childhood sexual abuse with detachment, sex workers who shed tears while telling of betrayal that led them to be trafficked as children, and gang members who talk about missing out on having their parents' affection." Breanna Robinson wrote in Indy100 that "Soft White Underbelly is captivating because of the way it humanizes those who have society's stamp of condemnation on them."

The channel gained attention in 2021 with the death of a previous interviewee, Amanda.

References

External links
 Soft White Underbelly on YouTube

English-language YouTube channels
YouTube channels launched in 2016